Cromstrijen (Cromstrien in local dialect) was a municipality on the Hoeksche Waard Island in the western Netherlands, in the province of South Holland. It was formed on 1 January 1984, when the municipalities on the Hoeksche Waard were merged into larger municipalities. On 1 January 2019 it was merged with the municipalities of Binnenmaas, Korendijk, Oud-Beijerland, and Strijen to form the municipality of Hoeksche Waard.

The municipality of Cromstrijen consists of the communities Klaaswaal and Numansdorp (townhall).

Topography

Dutch topographic map of the municipality of Cromstrijen, June 2015

See also

References

External links
Official website

Hoeksche Waard
Former municipalities of South Holland
Municipalities of the Netherlands disestablished in 2019